The 1972 FIBA Europe Under-18 Championship (known at that time as 1972 European Championship for Juniors) was an international basketball competition held in Zadar, SFR Yugoslavia in 1972.

Final standings

Team Roster
Dragan Todorić, Franc Volaj, Milan Grabovac, Dragan Kićanović, Rajko Žižić, Milan Milićević, Boris Beravs, Ratko Kaljević, Mirza Delibašić, Čedomir Perinčić, and Željko Jerkov.
Head coach: Mirko Novosel.

External links
FIBA Archive

FIBA U18 European Championship
1972–73 in European basketball
1972–73 in Yugoslav basketball
International youth basketball competitions hosted by Yugoslavia
International youth basketball competitions hosted by Croatia